Jeremy Harris (born December 7, 1950) is an American politician who served as Mayor of Honolulu, Hawaii from 1994 to 2004.  A biologist by training, Harris started his political career as a delegate to the 1978 Hawaii State Constitutional Convention.  While Harris served as chief executive of the City & County of Honolulu, the city was named "America's Greatest City" by the official American governance journal, Governing Magazine.  Harris is the founder of the China-U.S. Conference of Mayors and Business Leaders and the Japan-American Conference of Mayors and Chamber of Commerce Presidents.  He is married to Ramona Sachiko Akui Harris and lives in Kalihi Valley on the island of O'ahu.

Early years

Born and raised in Wilmington, Delaware, Harris moved to Honolulu to study at the University of Hawaiʻi at Mānoa, where he obtained dual undergraduate degrees in related biology fields.  Upon graduation, Harris went on to the University of California at Irvine, where he obtained his master's degree in population and environmental biology, specializing in urban ecosystems.  He returned to Hawaii and settled on the island of Kauai, where he was a professor at Kauai Community College and marine advisor with the University of Hawaii Sea Grant Program.

Political career

Harris was elected by his fellow Kauai residents to serve as their delegate to the 1978 Hawaii State Constitutional Convention.  The convention of 1978 came to be recognized as one of the most important events in Hawaii history as from its body of delegates, many would become future "giants of Hawaii politics" as the media would later recall.  Harris debated alongside John D. Waihee III, future governor of Hawaii, as well as future legislative leaders Carol Fukunaga, Helene Hale, Les Ihara, Jr., Barbara Marumoto and Joseph M. Souki.

In 1979, Harris was elected to the Kauai County Council where he served a single two-year term.  In 1984, he joined the City & County of Honolulu as executive assistant to Mayor Frank F. Fasi.  He was soon promoted to deputy managing director and then managing director.  In 1994, Fasi resigned as mayor of Honolulu and in the line of succession, Harris assumed the office.

Mayor of Honolulu

Harris won a special election to become mayor of Honolulu outright in September 1994.  He was re-elected in 1996 and 2000, appealing mostly to Chinese American, Filipino American and Japanese American communities.  During his tenure, Honolulu residents voted to limit mayors to two four-year terms and thus made Harris ineligible for re-election in 2004.  Former members of the Honolulu City Council Duke Bainum and Mufi Hannemann and former mayor Frank F. Fasi ran to succeed Harris, with Hannemann ultimately the victor.

Harris is recognized as having executed the most complete government system overhaul in Honolulu history.  He reorganized all municipal departments mostly by mergers to streamline all services provided by the city and county.  He also curtailed urban sprawl by reforming the system of land use planning to preserve open spaces and agricultural districts. Particularly during his first term, his management skills and those of his chief assistants were marginal and millions of dollars were embezzled or wasted as a result.

Harris's most ambitious and controversial project was 21st Century Oahu: A Shared Vision for the Future.  21st Century Oahu is a community based visioning program where neighborhoods would be given some control and CIP funding priority over their own community development, urban planning and beautification projects.  Hundreds of public safety, environment, transportation, cultural and recreation construction projects were initiated and many completed as an outgrowth of Harris's 21st Century Oahu project.

Gubernatorial campaign of 2002

Harris was considered a favorite to win the 2002 race for governor of Hawaii.  However, high-level Democratic Party insiders who had backed fellow Democrats against Harris in 1994, 1996 and 2000 did not want to relinquish the governorship and party leadership to this independent-minded Democrat, and thus fought against his candidacy, beginning with a public campaign demanding Harris resign as mayor if he intended to run for governor. In the spring of 2002, local news media reported allegations of campaign finance wrongdoing by some of Harris's staffers. Despite polling close to presumptive Republican nominee Linda Lingle, Harris bowed out of the gubernatorial race.  Hawaii Democratic leaders then backed incumbent Lieutenant Governor Mazie Hirono, a favorite of Sen. Daniel Inouye, for the nomination instead.

Legacy

He built the Marine Education Center at the Hanauma Bay Nature Preserve, continued the Waikiki Revitalization project started by Mayor Fasi that changed the look of Waikiki's main thoroughfares, Queen's Surf Beach, Kuhio Beach and Kapiolani Park Bandstand, established torchlighting ceremonies and hula performances every night at Waikiki, and started Brunch on the Beach.  However, critics of Harris, including his successor Mufi Hannemann, contend that these programs came at the expense of basic city services and infrastructure.

Harris has the distinction of being the only mayor to be elected more than once as United States Public Administrator of the Year by the American Society of Public Administration.  Twice, Honolulu's "The Bus" was honored as America's best transportation system.  Other foremost national societies named Honolulu first on the list of Kid Friendly Cities as well as the most digitally and technologically advanced city in the United States.

Harris made waves on the international stage as the founder of the Mayors' Asia-Pacific Environmental Summit.  Delegates in 1999, who included over 400 leaders from the Asia-Pacific Rim nations, voted to establish a permanent secretariat in Honolulu in Harris's honor.  Harris also established the Pacific Islands Environmental Symposium, the China-U.S. Conference of Mayors and Business Leaders, the Asia Pacific Urban Technology Institute and the Japan-American Conference of Mayors and Chamber of Commerce Presidents.

References

External links

 City & County of Honolulu
 "Jeremy's World Editorial Cartoons", John Pritchett

1950 births
Living people
Mayors of Honolulu
Kauai County Council members
Hawaii Democrats
University of Hawaiʻi at Mānoa alumni